Glen Campbell Live! His Greatest Hits is the fifty-fourth album by American singer/guitarist Glen Campbell, released in 1994 (see 1994 in music).

Track listing
 "Gentle on My Mind" (John Hartford)
 "By The Time I Get to Phoenix" (Jimmy Webb)
 "Galveston" (Jimmy Webb)
 "Kentucky Means Paradise" (Merle Travis)
 "Wichita Lineman" (Jimmy Webb)
 "Mansion in Branson" (Paul Overstreet, B. Braddock)
 "Here in the Real World" (Alan Jackson, M. Irwin)
 "Classical Gas" (Mason Williams)
 "Rhinestone Cowboy" (Larry Weiss)
 "Hits Medley":
 "It's Only Make Believe" (Conway Twitty, Jack Nance)
 "Turn Around, Look at Me" (Jerry Capehart, Glen Campbell)
 "Where's The Playground Suzie" (Jimmy Webb)
 "Hey Little One" (Dorsey Burnette, Barry DeVorzon)
 "Country Boy (You Got Your Feet in LA)" (Dennis Lambert, Brian Potter)
 "Mary in the Morning" (J. Cymbal, Michael Rashkow)
 "Dreams of the Everyday Housewife" (Chris Gantry)
 "Sunflower" (Neil Diamond)
 "Let It Be Me" (Mann Curtis, Gilbert Bécaud) duet with Debby Campbell
 "No More Night" (W. Harrah)
 "Southern Nights" (Allen Toussaint)

Personnel
Glen Campbell – vocals, acoustic guitar, electric guitar
Debby Campbell – vocals
Gary Bruzesse – vocals, drums
Jeff Dayton – vocals, acoustic guitar, electric guitar
Noel Kirkland – vocals, fiddle, banjo, acoustic guitar, keyboards
T.J. Kuenster – musical director, vocals, keyboards
Kenny Skaggs – vocals, acoustic guitar, steel guitar, dobro, mandolin
Russ Skaggs – vocals, bass guitar

Production
Producer – Ed Keeley
Recording Engineers (studio) – Chuck Haines, David Hieronymus
Recording engineers (mobile) – Chuck Haines, D. C. Tong
Cover – Michael Matousek/Matousek Design
Photography – Sandra Gillard/Lightkeepers
Publicity – Sandy Brokaw
Mixed, digitally edited and mastered by Chuck Haines, Ed Keeley, David Hieronymus, Chris Milfred at Chelsea Studio, Nashville, TN
Theatre audio staff – Bill Maclay, Michael Spence, Jeff Wyatt

References

1994 live albums
Glen Campbell live albums